Patty James Bentley (born September 20, 1970) is an American politician who has served in the Georgia House of Representatives from the 139th district since 2013.

References

1971 births
Living people
People from Butler, Georgia
Democratic Party members of the Georgia House of Representatives
21st-century American politicians
21st-century American women politicians
Women state legislators in Georgia (U.S. state)